The Chinese Chemical Society (CCS) is a professional society of chemists headquartered in Beijing. It is part of the China Association for Science and Technology. Current membership is at around 55,000.

History
The CCS was founded in Nanjing on August 4, 1932.  It merged with the Chinese Chemical Engineering Society in 1959.  The organizations were separated again in 1963.  CSS has been a member of the International Union of Pure and Applied Chemistry (IUPAC) since 1980 and of the Federation of Asian Chemical Societies (FACS) since 1984.

International affiliations
 Pacific Polymer Federation (PPF)
 International Society of Electrochemistry (ISE)
 International Association of Catalysis Societies (IACS)
 International Confederation for Thermal Analysis and Calorimetry (ICTAC)

Publications

The CCS publishes many academic journals, including:
CCS Chemistry
Acta Chimica Sinica
Chinese J. Chemistry
Chinese Chemical Letters
Chemistry Bulletin
Acta Physico-Chimica Sinica
Journal of Inorganic Chemistry
Organic Chemistry
Analytical Chemistry
Journal of Applied Chemistry
Journal of Chromatography
Organic Chemistry
Acta Polymerica Sinica
Chinese J. Polym. Sci.
Polymer Bulletin
Electrochemistry
Journal of Catalysis
Chinese J. Molecular Science
Journal of Fuel Chemistry and Technology
Journal of Structural Chemistry
University Chemistry
Journal of Chemical Education

See also
 Chemical Society Located in Taipei

References

External links
Chinese Chemical Society website

Professional associations based in China
Chemistry societies
Science and technology in China
1932 establishments in China